"The Six Million Dollar Mon" is the seventh episode of the seventh season of the animated sitcom Futurama. It originally aired on Comedy Central on July 25, 2012.

The episode was written by Ken Keeler and directed by Peter Avanzino.

Plot
Hermes starts performance reviews so that he may rid Planet Express of its worst employee, implying that this will be Zoidberg. Upon completing the review and finding the entire crew lackluster, Hermes determines he is the worst-performing employee, spending too much time reviewing performance. He fires himself and has the Central Bureaucracy replace him with a robot to handle the accounting for Planet Express.

Hermes begins to feel useless. This is compounded by the fact that he and LaBarbara are attacked by the psychotic robot Roberto and only saved by the robot police officer URL. After Roberto is executed, Hermes goes to a black market "upgrade" shop run by Yuri and obtains a robotic upgrade. He finds the upgrade helps to improve his life, and frequents the shop, upgrading his human body despite promises to LaBarbara and Dwight that he will stop. Eventually, he replaces all his human parts except his brain, proves he is more valuable than the robot put in his place, and returns to the Planet Express crew. The crew learns that Zoidberg has been getting Hermes' discarded parts and stitched his body up to use as a ventriloquist dummy named Little Hermes, turning it into a comedy act which impresses everyone but offends Hermes, who feels he needs to replace his brain with a computer.

When Yuri does not want to do the brain replacement, Hermes, Professor Farnsworth, and Bender head to the robot graveyard to exhume a robot body for a processor. Unbeknownst to them, the processor belongs to Roberto. For the procedure to work, Hermes locks his family and the Planet Express crew in the lab until Farnsworth completes the transplant. LaBarbara and Hermes' friends convince Farnsworth to stop this, but Zoidberg volunteers to complete the operation using Hermes' human body to help him. After the removal of the brain, LaBarbara is devastated, but Zoidberg reveals that he did it to bring her husband back, placing the brain in Little Hermes. Hermes comes back to life in his original body, realizing that he gave up his humanity for the pointless pursuit of perfectionism. The crew learns that the processor belongs to Roberto, who comes to life and reshapes his head. Wanting to eat Hermes' skin, Roberto uses the robot body to remove a piece of Hermes' skin, but discovers he cannot tolerate it because of LaBarbara's curried goat. Roberto's body melts. Encouraged by LaBarbara, Hermes thanks Zoidberg for restoring him.

Reception
Zack Handlen of The A.V. Club enjoyed the episode and gave it an A−.

References

External links
 
 "The Six Million Dollar Mon" at the Infosphere, the Futurama Wiki

2012 American television episodes
Futurama (season 7) episodes
Television episodes about cyborgs
Brain transplantation in fiction
Television episodes written by Ken Keeler